Zénon Trudeau (1748–1813) was a soldier, planter, and administrator who served as Lieutenant-governor of Upper Louisiana, New Spain, between 1792 and 1799.

Biography
Born in New Orleans, Trudeau joined the Spanish Army in his youth, a place where he excelled, attaining the rank of captain of the Regiment of Infantry and lieutenant colonel.

In 1792, Zénon Trudeau was appointed Lieutenant-governor of Upper Louisiana, a position located in St. Louis.  During his administration two new posts were established.  He commanded the galiot La Flèche in an expedition from Natchez to St. Louis and back in the winter of 1793.

In 1797, he granted lands which would later be part of the state of Missouri to Joseph Conway and his family, and to his friend Daniel Boone and his family (offering him 850 acres).  Trudeau left his position as Lieutenant-governor of Alta Luisiana in 1799, being succeeded by Charles de Hault de Lassus.

Zénon Trudeau was the ancestor of Dr. Edward Trudeau, Garry Trudeau and Byron E. Thomas Jr..

See also
Charles Trudeau (politician), his brother

References 

Politicians from New Orleans
Commandants and Lieutenants of the Illinois Country
People of Colonial Spanish Louisiana
1748 births
1813 deaths